The 1951 Critérium du Dauphiné Libéré was the 5th edition of the cycle race and was held from 10 June to 17 June 1951. The race started and finished in Grenoble. The race was won by Nello Lauredi of the Helyett team.

General classification

References

1951
1951 in French sport
June 1951 sports events in Europe